Twan Sanchez Russell (born April 25, 1974) is a former American football linebacker in the National Football League for the Washington Redskins, the Miami Dolphins, and the Atlanta Falcons.  He played college football at the University of Miami.

High school
Russell attended St. Thomas Aquinas High School, where he played football.  He also participated in track and field, where he won the State Championship in the 300-meter hurdles.

College career
Russell then received a scholarship to play for the Miami Hurricanes where he led the team in tackles (115) and was named Special teams Captain.

Russell graduated with degrees in Broadcast communications and Criminology.

Professional career
Russell was drafted in the fifth round of the 1997 NFL Draft by the Washington Redskins.  He would also play for the Miami Dolphins and the Atlanta Falcons before retiring from injury in November 2004.

1974 births
Living people
American football linebackers
Washington Redskins players
Miami Dolphins players
Atlanta Falcons players
Players of American football from Fort Lauderdale, Florida
People from Plantation, Florida
Russell, Twan